Stefan Gråhns (born April 19, 1982) is a Swedish ice hockey player. He is currently playing with Växjö Lakers of the Swedish Hockey League (SHL).

Grahns made his Elitserien debut playing with Södertälje SK during the 2001–02 Elitserien season.

References

External links

1982 births
Living people
Swedish ice hockey forwards
Växjö Lakers players
People from Södertälje
Sportspeople from Stockholm County